Fylde Rural District was a rural district in the county of Lancashire, England. It was created in 1894 and abolished in 1974 under the Local Government Act 1972.

It comprised 21 civil parishes to the south of Fleetwood, east of Blackpool, north of Lytham and west of Preston.

It had a population of 10,235 in 1901 and 17,370 in 1961.

References

External links
Map of Fylde RD at Vision of Britain

History of Lancashire
Districts of England created by the Local Government Act 1894
Districts of England abolished by the Local Government Act 1972
Rural districts of England